Pinus aristata, the Rocky Mountain bristlecone pine (or the Colorado bristlecone pine),  is a long-living species of bristlecone pine tree native to the United States. It appears in the Rocky Mountains in Colorado and northern New Mexico, with isolated populations in the San Francisco Peaks in Arizona and the Kaibab National Forest north of the Grand Canyon.

Description

Mature trunk diameter is highly variable. The bark is grey-brown, thin and scaly at the base of the trunk.

The cones open to  broad when mature, releasing the seeds immediately after opening. The nutcrackers use the seeds as a food resource, storing many for later use, and some of these stored seeds are not used and are able to grow into new plants.

It differs most conspicuously from the two other bristlecone pine species in that the needles usually have only one resin canal (or rarely two), and these are commonly interrupted and broken, leading to highly characteristic small white resin flecks appearing on the needles. This character, which looks a bit like 'dandruff' on the needles, is diagnostic of Pinus aristata; no other pine shows it (though sometimes, scale insect infestations can look superficially similar).

It is a long-lived tree, though not attaining the longevity of Pinus longaeva. The oldest known tree, which grows high on Black Mountain in Colorado, was found to have a 2,435-year tree ring record (and overall estimated age of 2,480 years, per Craig Brunstein) in 1992. However, trees rarely live over 1,500 years.

This species was previously described as a subspecies of Pinus balfouriana (Pinus balfouriana aristata). Pinus aristata is currently regarded as one of three closely related species known as bristlecone pines and is sometimes named Rocky Mountains bristlecone pine or Colorado bristlecone pine.
In addition to its informal and regional names, the trees are referred to as the foxtail pine or hickory pine.

Cultivation
Pinus aristata is by far the most common of the bristlecone pines in cultivation, where it is a very attractive slow-growing small tree suitable for small gardens in cold climates. Even so, it is never as long-lived as in the wild, typically living less than 100 years before it succumbs to root decay in the warmer, moister conditions prevalent in most inhabited places.

References

Further reading

External links

 Gymnosperm Database: Pinus aristata
 Flora of North America: Pinus aristata
 High-elevation white pine educational website: Pinus aristata
 HikeArizona.COM Images: Pinus aristata
 Photo of cone (scroll to bottom of page)
 USDA Plants Profile: Pinus aristata

aristata
Flora of the Rocky Mountains
Trees of the Southwestern United States
Trees of the South-Central United States
Garden plants of North America
Drought-tolerant plants
Ornamental trees
Trees of the United States